Ichiro Nakamura (died 1999), was the late director of the Society of Johrei, Kyoto, Japan.

Nakamura inherited and developed Rev. Mokichi Okada's (1882–1955) teaching on the religious school of Church of World Messianity. Okada claimed to have received a special revelation from God in 1926, leading him to found a new religion in 1935 to spread the teachings.

The Mokichi Okada Association (MOA) was established in 1980 to continue his work "toward the creation of a new civilization to be undertaken without confining Okada's principles and their implementation within a religious framework". Much of Okada's extensive art collection is now housed in the MOA Museum of Art in Atami, Japan.

In 1984, the book "Johrei: Divine Light of Salvation" co-edited by Ichiro Nakamura and Teruyuki Tada was published and proved to a success in introducing the Meishusama's teachings to a broader audience. The book has been translated into several languages spoken by large populations, for example, Chinese, Urdu, Portuguese, etc.

The aim of Church of World Messianity is to help to establish the conditions for a Paradise on Earth by eliminating the three great tragedies: illness, poverty and conflict. The principal activities are the Johrei, appreciation of the Beauty and natural farming.

External links
Society of Johrei

Bibliography

Nakamura, Ichiro and Tada, Teruyuki, eds. Johrei: Divine Light of Salvation, Kyoto: Society of Johrei, 1984.
Nakamura, Ichiro and Tada, Teruyuki, eds. Johrei: Divine Light of Salvation, Kyoto: Society of Johrei (Chinese translation), 2003.
Nakamura, Ichiro. "Mokichi Okada's Idea of Ultimate Reality and Meaning." Ultimate Reality and Meaning: Interdisciplinary Studies in the Philosophy of Understanding 11, pp. 279–293, December 1988.

Japanese religious leaders
1999 deaths
Year of birth missing